Leopold Canal may refer to:

 Leopold Canal (Belgium)
 Leopold Canal (Baden-Württemberg), Germany